Eric Siday (1 November 1905 – 26 March 1976) was a British-American composer and musician. While most commonly known for his pioneering work in electroacoustic music, his early career was that of a hot-jazz violinist in the London dance bands in the Roaring ’20s, including Ray Starita's Piccadilly Revels. Even then, as a young violinist, his improvised soloing style was amazingly advanced for his era. He played with a remarkably modern chromatic style, verging on atonal, often incorporating multi-stops (playing up to four notes in harmony on the violin simultaneously utilizing multiple fingers).

In 1939, he emigrated to the US. He was the first composer to systematically utilize electro-acoustic sound potential within the television medium, particularly with his invention of the sound logo and the Musical Rorschach test.

His now-legendary Maxwell House "Percolator" TV commercial was one of these first innovations. He also commissioned Robert Moog to create the first percussion synthesizer, which he used extensively in his television work. Among his other contributions to the use of electro-acoustic music in television were numerous station IDs and commercials, including that of the National Educational Television network (the forerunner to PBS), the 1966 CBS "in color" bumper, the news sounder for the ABC Radio Networks, and the 1965–1976 Screen Gems/Columbia Pictures Television logos.

Throughout his life, Siday was also an educator, creating many radio broadcasts about the nature of the so-called new music and new sound. In addition to his large commercial repertoire, he composed a number of extended works, both traditional and experimental. In the years before his death, he devoted considerable effort to exploring new ways in which to use electro-acoustic music in the building of special sound environments. Use of new music through practical design concepts was his forte.

Motorsport
In 1931 Eric purchased a Frazer Nash Ulster registration HX3535 and then was subsequently invited to join the works team for the 1932 German Grand Prix automobile d'Allemagne held at the Nürburgring Nordschleife circuit on 17 July 1932 driving his H.J. Aldington entered fitted with a supercharged 1.5 Litre Meadows Engine.  He qualified 5th in class and there was quite a lot of interest to see how Eric and his team mate Archie Fane would get on with the new "blown" ohv cars but unfortunately the car was withdrawn on lap 12 with a leaking fuel tank.

Personal life
Eric Siday was the brother of R.E. Siday, a mathematician who specialized in quantum mechanics. Eric was married to Edith (Gerber) Siday until his death in 1976.

Siday died in 1976 in Manhattan; services were held at Riverside Memorial Chapel.

Legacy 
The Eric and Edith Siday Charitable Foundation was established in 1998 in memory of the composer Eric Siday and his wife Edith. The Foundation is dedicated, inter alia, to the promotion of musical creativity, among both professionals and gifted, underprivileged youth. His archives, which included business records, personal papers, music scores, photographs, and tapes, were donated to the New York Public Library.

References

External links 
 Eric Siday archive at New York Public Library

1905 births
1976 deaths
American electronic musicians
British electronic musicians
English racing drivers
British emigrants to the United States
Musicians from London
20th-century classical musicians
20th-century English composers